The 2017 Clermont-Ferrand Sevens is the penultimate tournament of the 2017 Rugby Europe Grand Prix Series, hosted by Stade Gabriel Montpied at Clermont-Ferrand. It was held over the weekend of 1–2 July 2017. Ireland won the tournament, defeating Russia 17-14 in the final. With the tournament's conclusion, the two countries, as well as Spain, remain in the mix for qualification at the 2018 Rugby World Cup Sevens.

Teams

Pool Stage

Pool A

Pool B

Pool C

Knockout stage

Challenge Trophy

5th Place

Cup

Overall

References

External links
 Official page 

2017–18 in French rugby union
Rugby sevens competitions in France
Grand Prix 3
International rugby union competitions hosted by France